The 2005–06 Serie A season was the 72nd season of the Serie A, the top level of ice hockey in Italy. Eight teams participated in the league, and the HC Milano Vipers won the championship by defeating SV Ritten in the final.

First round

Second round

Group A

Group B

Playoffs

Semifinals
 HC Milano Vipers - HC Alleghe 3:1 (5:2, 4:5 OT, 6:1, 6:5 OT)
 SV Ritten - SG Cortina 3:2 (2:5, 4:6, 4:3 OT, 3:1, 5:2)

Final 
 HC Milano Vipers - SV Ritten 3:0 (4:1, 3:1, 4:3 SO)

External links
 Season on hockeyarchives.info

Serie A (ice hockey) seasons
Italy
2005–06 in Italian ice hockey